General Sir Ivo Lucius Beresford Vesey  (11 August 1876 – 19 February 1975) was a British Army officer who served as Chief of the General Staff in India from 1937 to 1939.

Military career
Born the second son of Major General George Henry Vesey and educated at Wellington College and the Royal Military College Sandhurst, Vesey was commissioned as a second lieutenant in the Queen's Royal Regiment on 20 February 1897. He was promoted to lieutenant on 20 October 1898. He served in the Second Boer War of 1899–1902, where he was wounded in the Battle of Colenso on 15 December 1899, and later served in the Natal from March to June 1900, including action at Laing's Nek in June. While in South Africa, he was acting adjutant of the 2nd Battalion of his regiment from 15 May to 29 November 1900. After peace was declared in May 1902, Vesey left South Africa on board the SS Bavarian and arrived in the United Kingdom the following month.

Vesey later served in the First World War and then became Director of Recruiting and Organisation at the War Office in 1919. He was appointed Director of Organisation and Staff Duties at the Air Ministry in 1923, General Officer Commanding of 48th South Midland Division in 1930 and Director of Staff Duties at the War Office in 1931. He went on to be General Officer Commanding-in-Chief at Western Command, India in 1935, General Officer Commanding-in-Chief at Southern Command, India in March 1936 and Chief of the General Staff in India in 1937 before retiring in 1939. He served in the Second World War as a battalion commander in the Home Guard. He was also Colonel of the Queen's Royal Regiment from 1939 to 1945.

Family
In 1913, Vesey married Geraldine Foley; they had two sons.

Honours and awards

References

External links
 Imperial War Museum Interview
 Imperial War Museum Interview

|-
 

|-
 

|-
 

|-

1876 births
1975 deaths
British Army generals
Knights Commander of the Order of the Bath
Knights Commander of the Order of the British Empire
Companions of the Order of St Michael and St George
Companions of the Distinguished Service Order
People educated at Wellington College, Berkshire
Graduates of the Royal Military College, Sandhurst
Queen's Royal Regiment officers
British Home Guard officers
British Army personnel of World War I
British Army personnel of World War II
Recipients of the Croix de guerre (Belgium)
Knights of the Order of Saints Maurice and Lazarus
Officers of the Order of the Crown (Belgium)
British Army personnel of the Second Boer War
People from Dorking
Military personnel from Surrey